Padimate O is an organic compound related to the water-soluble compound PABA (4-aminobenzoic acid) that is used as an ingredient in some sunscreens.  This yellowish water-insoluble oily liquid is an ester formed by the condensation of 2-ethylhexanol with dimethylaminobenzoic acid.  Other names for padimate O include 2-ethylhexyl 4-dimethylaminobenzoate, Escalol 507, octyldimethyl PABA, and OD-PABA.

Photobiology
Padimate O absorbs ultraviolet rays, thereby preventing direct DNA damage by UV-B. However, the thus-excited padimate O molecule may then react with DNA to produce indirect DNA damage, similar to the effects of ionizing radiation. An in vitro yeast study conducted in 1993 demonstrated the sunlight-induced mutagenicity of padimate O.  The photobiological properties of padimate O resemble those of Michler's ketone, which is considered photocarcinogenic in rats and mice. These findings suggest that padimate O might also be photocarcinogenic.

However, multiple in vivo studies conducted in hairless mice following topical application of padimate O have demonstrated no carcinogenic effects and that padimate O reduces the number of and delays the appearance of UV-induced skin tumors.

See also
 Padimate A, a related sunscreen ingredient
 Sunscreen controversy.

References

4-Aminobenzoate esters
Sunscreening agents